Yagashwam is a 1978 Indian Malayalam film, directed by Hariharan. The film stars Prem Nazir, Adoor Bhasi, Jose Prakash and Sankaradi in the lead roles. The film has musical score by G. Devarajan and M. S. Baburaj.

Cast
Prem Nazir as Unnikrishnan 
K. R. Vijaya as Sreedevi 
Vidhubala as Nandini
K. P. Ummer as Balachandran
Adoor Bhasi as Gopala Pilla
Jose Prakash as Vishvanathan Pilla 
Sankaradi as Govinda Marar 
Sathaar as Appukuttan
Janardanan as Vijayan
Pattom Sadan as Narayanan
Iduvil Unnikrishnan as Villager
Meena as Ammalu 
Paravoor Bharathan as Kuttan Pilla
Bhaskara Kuruppu as Kuruppu
Priya as Reetha

Soundtrack
The music was composed by G. Devarajan and M. S. Baburaj and the lyrics were written by Mankombu Gopalakrishnan and Yusufali Kechery.

References

External links
 

1978 films
1970s Malayalam-language films
Films directed by Hariharan
Films scored by M. S. Baburaj
Films scored by G. Devarajan